Cerro Prieto is a volcano located approximately 29 km (18 mi) SSE of Mexicali in the Mexican state of Baja California. The volcano lies astride a spreading center associated with the East Pacific Rise.  This spreading center is also responsible for a large geothermal field, which has been harnessed to generate electric power by the Cerro Prieto Geothermal Power Station.

The Cerro Prieto spreading center intersects the southern end of the Imperial Fault and the northern end of the Cerro Prieto Fault.  Both of these are transform faults in the northern leg of the East Pacific Rise system that runs the length of the Gulf of California and is steadily rifting the Baja California Peninsula away from the mainland of Mexico.

References

External links
 Geology of the Salton Trough, David L. Alles ed., 2007
 

Volcanoes of Baja California
Geothermal areas in Mexico
Landforms of Baja California
Salton Trough